Lucas Mineiro may refer to:

 Lucas Mineiro (footballer, born 1992), Lucas Alberto Pereira da Silva, Brazilian football midfielder
 Lucas Mineiro (footballer, born 1996), Lucas da Silva Izidoro, Brazilian football midfielder